Daniel Scott (born 1985) is a former American soccer player.

Career

Youth and Amateur
Scott started for four years at Gonzaga University earning All-WCC West Coast Honors his Senior season before signing with Tacoma Tide for the 2008 Premier Development League season. In 2009, he moved to Seattle Wolves of the PDL where he earned All-League and All-Western Conference first team selections. In 2009, Scott also spent time with the reserve squad for Seattle Sounders FC of Major League Soccer.

Scott stayed within the PDL in 2010 and 2011 with Kitsap Pumas. In 2011, he again earned All-League and All-Western Conference first team selections in helping lead Kitsap to the PDL Championship Title.

Professional
On August 30, 2011 Scott signed with FC Tampa Bay of the North American Soccer League. The club signed Scott to a 2012 contract, plus a club option for 2013, on November 16, 2011.  He made his debut for the club on April 14, 2012, in a 1–0 win over FC Edmonton.

Scott signed with Carolina RailHawks on January 29, 2014 finishing his career in 2016 after appearing in 42 matches and scoring one goal with Carolina.

Personal
Scott is the younger brother of Zach Scott, a professional soccer player with Seattle Sounders FC in Major League Soccer.

References

1986 births
Living people
American soccer players
Soccer players from Hawaii
Gonzaga Bulldogs men's soccer players
Seattle Sounders FC U-23 players
Washington Crossfire players
Kitsap Pumas players
Tampa Bay Rowdies players
North Carolina FC players
USL League Two players
North American Soccer League players
People from Maui
Association football defenders